The 1960–61 Divizia B was the 21st season of the second tier of the Romanian football league system.

The format has been maintained to three series, each of them having 14 teams. At the end of the season the winners of the series promoted to Divizia A and the last two places from each series relegated to Regional Championship.

Team changes

To Divizia B
Promoted from Regional Championship
 Academia Militară București
 Arieșul Turda
 CFR Roșiori
 Chimia Govora
 Dinamo Săsar
 Dinamo Barza
 IS Brăila
 Steaua Roșie Bacău
 Voința Târgu Mureș

Relegated from Divizia A
 Minerul Lupeni
 Jiul Petroșani

From Divizia B
Relegated to Regional Championship
 Victoria Buzău
 Metalul Oțelu Roșu
 CFR Arad
 Sportul Muncitoresc Radăuți
 Carpați Sinaia
 CS Târgu Mureș

Promoted to Divizia A
 CSMS Iași
 Știința Timișoara
 Corvinul Hunedoara

Renamed teams 
ASA Sibiu was renamed as CSM Sibiu.

CS Craiova was renamed as CFR Electroputere Craiova.

Gaz Metan Mediaș was renamed as CSM Mediaș.

IS Brăila was renamed as CSM Brăila.

Metalul Titanii București was renamed as Metalul București.

Tractorul Orașul Stalin was renamed as Tractorul Brașov.

Unirea Focșani was renamed as Rapid Focșani.

Other teams 
CS Târgu Mureș and Voința Târgu Mureș merged, the first one being absorbed by the second one. After the merge Voința changed its name in Mureșul Târgu Mureș.

CFR Cluj and Rapid Cluj merged, the first one being absorbed by the second one. The new club was named CSM Cluj.

League tables

Serie I

Serie II

Serie III

See also 

 1960–61 Divizia A

References

Liga II seasons
Romania
2